Arthur Chen Feiyu (born 9 April 2000), is a Chinese actor. He is known for his roles in Secret Fruit (2017), Ever Night (2018), and Lighter & Princess (2022).

Early life and education
Arthur Chen was born in United States on 9 April 2000. In July 2021, Chen relinquished his United States citizenship and became a Chinese citizen.
 He is the second son of director Chen Kaige and actress Chen Hong.

He studied at Beijing Jingshan School and Tabor Academy, a private boarding school in Massachusetts. In 2019, he was admitted into Beijing Film Academy.

Career

2017-2018: Career beginnings
Chen first appeared in the 2010 film Sacrifice directed by Chen Kaige, portraying a young King. In 2017, Chen made his official acting debut in the youth drama film Secret Fruit as the male lead. He released his first single "The Secret Words" as the promotional song for the film.

2018-present: Rising popularity
In 2018, Chen starred in the historical fantasy drama Ever Night. The drama received positive reviews, and Chen was awarded the Super IP New Actor at the China Literature Award Ceremony and the Best Actor in the historical drama category at the Huading Awards. 

In 2019, Chen starred in the youth campus romance film My Best Summer. He won the Best Newcomer awards at the Tokyo International Film Festival and Macau International Film Festival for his performance. In the same year, Forbes China listed Chen on their "Under 30 Asia 2019" list which consisted of 30 influential people under 30 years old who have had a substantial effect in their fields.

In 2020, Chen is set to star in the film Flowers Bloom in the Ashes  directed by Chen Kaige; and fantasy wuxia drama Legend of Awakening. The same year Chen was cast in the xianxia drama Immortality alongside Luo Yunxi, based on the novel The Husky and His White Cat Shizun. He entered the Forbes China Celebrity 100 list for the first time, ranking 83rd.

Filmography

Film

Television series

Discography

Original soundtrack

Awards and nominations

References

External links 

 
 
 

2000 births
Living people
People who renounced United States citizenship
21st-century Chinese male actors
Chinese male television actors
Chinese male film actors
Beijing Film Academy alumni